The pedal disc (also known as a basal plate) is the surface opposite to the mouth of the sea anemone. It serves to attach the anemone to the substrate, or hard surface, upon which it lives. 

The pedal disc is composed of a thin tissue plate and is used by the animal to adhere to and move across the surface.

Notes

External links

Anthozoa